Ghyvelde is a commune in the Nord department in northern France. It is located on the Belgian border, and just inland from the North Sea. It is, after Bray-Dunes, the second most northern commune of France. The E40/A16 passes through the commune. On 1 January 2016, the former commune Les Moëres was merged into Ghyvelde.

Gallery

Heraldry

See also
Communes of the Nord department

References

Communes of Nord (French department)
Communes nouvelles of Nord
French Flanders